Eleftherios "Lefteris" Poupakis (Greek: Ελευθέριος "Λευτέρης" Πουπάκης; born 28 February 1946) is a retired Greek footballer who played as a goalkeeper.

During his career he played for Egaleo F.C., Olympiacos F.C., OFI Crete, Panathinaikos FC and Apollon Smyrnis F.C. He earned six caps for the Greece national football team, and participated in UEFA Euro 1980.

References

1946 births
Living people
Greek footballers
Greece international footballers
Olympiacos F.C. players
Panathinaikos F.C. players
Egaleo F.C. players
Apollon Smyrnis F.C. players
OFI Crete F.C. players
UEFA Euro 1980 players
Super League Greece players
Association football goalkeepers
People from Geropotamos
Footballers from Crete